Pa' Otro La'o (To Other Place) is the debut studio album by Dominican musician Chichí Peralta, released on July 1, 1997 by Caiman Music.

Track listing

Charts

Certifications

References 

1997 debut albums
Chichí Peralta albums
Spanish-language albums